Edward Johnston was a British scholar credited with the revival of calligraphy.

Edward Johnston may also refer to:
 Edward Johnston (artist), American artist and designer
 Edward Johnston (politician) or Bertie Johnston, Western Australian MLA and Australian Senator
 Edward Johnston (orientalist) (1885–1942), Sanskrit scholar and Oxford professor
 Edward Johnston (Medal of Honor) (1844–1920), American Indian Wars soldier and Medal of Honor recipient
 Edward E. Johnston (1918–2011), American administrator and businessman
 Edward Johnston (priest), Dean of Waikato
 Edward Harvey-Johnston (1912–1971), English cricketer
 Eddie Johnston (born 1935), hockey player

See also
Edward Johnstone (disambiguation)
Edward Johnson (disambiguation)